Vitali, Vitalii, Vitaly, Vitaliy and may refer to:

People

Given name
 Vitaly Borker (born 1975 or 1976), Ukrainian American Internet fraudster and cyberbully
 Vitaly Churkin (1952–2017), Russian politician
 Vitaly Ginzburg (1916–2009), Russian physicist
 Vitaly Grachev (born 1979), Ukrainian-Russian singer and songwriter
 Vitaliy Guimaraes (born 2000), American artistic gymnast
 Vitaly Kaloyev (born 1956), Russian architect and convicted murderer 
 Vitaliy Khan (born 1985), Kazakh freestyle swimmer
 Vitali Kiryushchenkov (born 1992), Belarusian ice hockey player
 Vitali Klitschko (born 1971), Ukrainian professional boxer
 Vitaliy Kolpakov (born 1972), Ukrainian athlete
 Vitaliy Konovalov (1932–2013), Soviet engineer and politician
 Vitali Konstantinov (born 1949), Russian wrestler
 Vitaly Petrov (born 1938), Ukrainian athletics coach
 Vitaly Petrov (born 1984), Russian racing driver
 Vitaly Scherbo (born 1972), Belarusian and former Soviet gymnast
 Vitali Sevastyanov (1935-2010), Soviet cosmonaut
 Vitaly Solomin (1941-2002), Soviet and Russian actor
 Vitali Taskinen (born 1986), Finnish ice hockey goaltender
 Vitaly (Ustinov) (1910–2006), Metropolitan of the Russian Orthodox Church Outside Russia (1986–2001)
 Vitali Vitaliev  (born 1954), British journalist and author
 Vitaly Zdorovetskiy (born 1992), Russian YouTube personality

Surname
 Alvaro Vitali (born 1950), Italian actor 
 Giancarlo Vitali (1926–2011), Italian footballer and manager
 Giancarlo Vitali (painter) (1929–2018), Italian painter
 Giovanni Battista Vitali (1632–1692), Baroque composer
 Giuseppe Vitali (1875–1932), Italian mathematician 
 Giuseppina Vitali (1845-1915), Italian composer and soprano 
 Ivan Vitali (1794–1855), Russian sculptor
 Keith Vitali (b. 1952), American martial artist, actor, producer, author and child activist
 Leon Vitali (1948–2022), British actor
 Maurizio Vitali (born 1957), Italian motorcycle racer
 Miroslaw Vitali (1914–1992), Polish-British surgeon
 Tommaso Antonio Vitali (1663–1745), Baroque composer

Other uses

 Vitalii

 Vitali Island, Philippines
 Vitali theorem (disambiguation) 

Italian-language surnames